Anton Pavlovich Chekhov (29 January 1860 – 15 July 1904) was a Russian playwright and short-story writer who is considered to be one of the greatest writers of all time. His career as a playwright produced four classics, and his best short stories are held in high esteem by writers and critics. Along with Henrik Ibsen and August Strindberg, Chekhov is often referred to as one of the three seminal figures in the birth of early modernism in the theatre. Chekhov was a physician by profession. "Medicine is my lawful wife", he once said, "and literature is my mistress."

Chekhov renounced the theatre after the reception of The Seagull in 1896, but the play was revived to acclaim in 1898 by Konstantin Stanislavski's Moscow Art Theatre, which subsequently also produced Chekhov's Uncle Vanya and premiered his last two plays, Three Sisters and The Cherry Orchard. These four works present a challenge to the acting ensemble as well as to audiences, because in place of conventional action Chekhov offers a "theatre of mood" and a "submerged life in the text". The plays that Chekhov wrote were not complex, but easy to follow, and created a somewhat haunting atmosphere for the audience.

Chekhov at first wrote stories to earn money, but as his artistic ambition grew, he made formal innovations that influenced the evolution of the modern short story. He made no apologies for the difficulties this posed to readers, insisting that the role of an artist was to ask questions, not to answer them.

Biography

Childhood

Anton Chekhov was born into a Russian family on the feast day of St. Anthony the Great (17 January Old Style) 29 January 1860 in Taganrog, a port on the Sea of Azov – on Politseyskaya (Police) street, later renamed Chekhova street – in southern Russia. He was the third of six surviving children. His father, Pavel Yegorovich Chekhov, the son of a former serf and his wife, was from the village Olkhovatka (Voronezh Governorate) and ran a grocery store. A director of the parish choir, devout Orthodox Christian, and physically abusive father, Pavel Chekhov has been seen by some historians as the model for his son's many portraits of hypocrisy. Chekhov's mother, Yevgeniya (Morozova), was an excellent storyteller who entertained the children with tales of her travels with her cloth-merchant father all over Russia. "Our talents we got from our father," Chekhov remembered, "but our soul from our mother."

In adulthood, Chekhov criticised his brother Alexander's treatment of his wife and children by reminding him of Pavel's tyranny: "Let me ask you to recall that it was despotism and lying that ruined your mother's youth. Despotism and lying so mutilated our childhood that it's sickening and frightening to think about it. Remember the horror and disgust we felt in those times when Father threw a tantrum at dinner over too much salt in the soup and called Mother a fool."

Chekhov attended the Greek School in Taganrog and the Taganrog Gymnasium (since renamed the Chekhov Gymnasium), where he was held back for a year at fifteen for failing an examination in Ancient Greek. He sang at the Greek Orthodox monastery in Taganrog and in his father's choirs. In a letter of 1892, he used the word "suffering" to describe his childhood and recalled:

In 1876, Chekhov's father was declared bankrupt after overextending his finances building a new house, having been cheated by a contractor named Mironov. To avoid debtor's prison he fled to Moscow, where his two eldest sons, Alexander and Nikolai, were attending university. The family lived in poverty in Moscow. Chekhov's mother was physically and emotionally broken by the experience. 

Chekhov was left behind to sell the family's possessions and finish his education. He remained in Taganrog for three more years, boarding with a man by the name of Selivanov who, like Lopakhin in The Cherry Orchard, had bailed out the family for the price of their house. Chekhov had to pay for his own education, which he managed by private tutoring, catching and selling goldfinches, and selling short sketches to the newspapers, among other jobs. He sent every ruble he could spare to his family in Moscow, along with humorous letters to cheer them up. 

During this time, he read widely and analytically, including the works of Cervantes, Turgenev, Goncharov, and Schopenhauer, and wrote a full-length comic drama, Fatherless, which his brother Alexander dismissed as "an inexcusable though innocent fabrication". Chekhov also experienced a series of love affairs, one with the wife of a teacher. In 1879, Chekhov completed his schooling and joined his family in Moscow, having gained admission to the medical school at I.M. Sechenov First Moscow State Medical University.

Early writings
Chekhov then assumed responsibility for the whole family. To support them and to pay his tuition fees, he wrote daily short, humorous sketches and vignettes of contemporary Russian life, many under pseudonyms such as "Antosha Chekhonte" (Антоша Чехонте) and "Man Without Spleen" (Человек без селезенки). His prodigious output gradually earned him a reputation as a satirical chronicler of Russian street life, and by 1882 he was writing for Oskolki (Fragments), owned by Nikolai Leykin, one of the leading publishers of the time. Chekhov's tone at this stage was harsher than that familiar from his mature fiction.

In 1884, Chekhov qualified as a physician, which he considered his principal profession though he made little money from it and treated the poor free of charge.

In 1884 and 1885, Chekhov found himself coughing blood, and in 1886 the attacks worsened, but he would not admit his tuberculosis to his family or his friends. He confessed to Leykin, "I am afraid to submit myself to be sounded by my colleagues." He continued writing for weekly periodicals, earning enough money to move the family into progressively better accommodations.

Early in 1886 he was invited to write for one of the most popular papers in St. Petersburg, Novoye Vremya (New Times), owned and edited by the millionaire magnate Alexey Suvorin, who paid a rate per line double Leykin's and allowed Chekhov three times the space. Suvorin was to become a lifelong friend, perhaps Chekhov's closest.

Before long, Chekhov was attracting literary as well as popular attention. The sixty-four-year-old Dmitry Grigorovich, a celebrated Russian writer of the day, wrote to Chekhov after reading his short story "The Huntsman" that "You have real talent, a talent that places you in the front rank among writers in the new generation." He went on to advise Chekhov to slow down, write less, and concentrate on literary quality.

Chekhov replied that the letter had struck him "like a thunderbolt" and confessed, "I have written my stories the way reporters write up their notes about fires—mechanically, half-consciously, caring nothing about either the reader or myself." The admission may have done Chekhov a disservice, since early manuscripts reveal that he often wrote with extreme care, continually revising. Grigorovich's advice nevertheless inspired a more serious, artistic ambition in the twenty-six-year-old. In 1888, with a little string-pulling by Grigorovich, the short story collection At Dusk (V Sumerkakh) won Chekhov the coveted Pushkin Prize "for the best literary production distinguished by high artistic worth".

Turning points

In 1887, exhausted from overwork and ill health, Chekhov took a trip to Ukraine, which reawakened him to the beauty of the steppe. On his return, he began the novella-length short story "The Steppe", which he called "something rather odd and much too original", and which was eventually published in Severny Vestnik (The Northern Herald). In a narrative that drifts with the thought processes of the characters, Chekhov evokes a chaise journey across the steppe through the eyes of a young boy sent to live away from home, and his companions, a priest and a merchant. "The Steppe" has been called a "dictionary of Chekhov's poetics", and it represented a significant advance for Chekhov, exhibiting much of the quality of his mature fiction and winning him publication in a literary journal rather than a newspaper.

In autumn 1887, a theatre manager named Korsh commissioned Chekhov to write a play, the result being Ivanov, written in a fortnight and produced that November. Though Chekhov found the experience "sickening" and painted a comic portrait of the chaotic production in a letter to his brother Alexander, the play was a hit and was praised, to Chekhov's bemusement, as a work of originality. Although Chekhov did not fully realise it at the time, Chekhov's plays, such as The Seagull (written in 1895), Uncle Vanya (written in 1897), The Three Sisters (written in 1900), and The Cherry Orchard (written in 1903) served as a revolutionary backbone to what is common sense to the medium of acting to this day: an effort to recreate and express the realism of how people truly act and speak with each other. This realistic manifestation of the human condition may engender in audiences reflection upon what it means to be human.

This philosophy of approaching the art of acting has stood not only steadfast, but as the cornerstone of acting for much of the 20th century to this day. Mikhail Chekhov considered Ivanov a key moment in his brother's intellectual development and literary career. From this period comes an observation of Chekhov's that has become known as Chekhov's gun, a dramatic principle that requires that every element in a narrative be necessary and irreplaceable, and that everything else be removed.

The death of Chekhov's brother Nikolai from tuberculosis in 1889 influenced A Dreary Story, finished that September, about a man who confronts the end of a life that he realises has been without purpose. Mikhail Chekhov, who recorded his brother's depression and restlessness after Nikolai's death, was researching prisons at the time as part of his law studies, and Anton Chekhov, in a search for purpose in his own life, himself soon became obsessed with the issue of prison reform.

Sakhalin

In 1890, Chekhov undertook an arduous journey by train, horse-drawn carriage, and river steamer to the Russian Far East and the katorga, or penal colony, on Sakhalin Island, north of Japan, where he spent three months interviewing thousands of convicts and settlers for a census. The letters Chekhov wrote during the two-and-a-half-month journey to Sakhalin are considered to be among his best. His remarks to his sister about Tomsk were to become notorious.

Chekhov witnessed much on Sakhalin that shocked and angered him, including floggings, embezzlement of supplies, and forced prostitution of women. He wrote,  "There were times I felt that I saw before me the extreme limits of man's degradation." He was particularly moved by the plight of the children living in the penal colony with their parents. For example:

Chekhov later concluded that charity was not the answer, but that the government had a duty to finance humane treatment of the convicts. His findings were published in 1893 and 1894 as Ostrov Sakhalin (The Island of Sakhalin), a work of social science, not literature. Chekhov found literary expression for the "Hell of Sakhalin" in his long short story "The Murder", the last section of which is set on Sakhalin, where the murderer Yakov loads coal in the night while longing for home. Chekhov's writing on Sakhalin, especially the traditions and habits of the Gilyak people, is the subject of a sustained meditation and analysis in Haruki Murakami's novel 1Q84. It is also the subject of a poem by the Nobel Prize winner Seamus Heaney, "Chekhov on Sakhalin" (collected in the volume Station Island). Rebecca Gould has compared Chekhov's book on Sakhalin to Katherine Mansfield's Urewera Notebook (1907). In 2013, the Wellcome Trust-funded play 'A Russian Doctor', performed by Andrew Dawson and researched by Professor Jonathan Cole, explored Chekhov's experiences on Sakhalin Island.

Melikhovo

Mikhail Chekhov, a member of the household at Melikhovo, described the extent of his brother's medical commitments:

Chekhov's expenditure on drugs was considerable, but the greatest cost was making journeys of several hours to visit the sick, which reduced his time for writing. However, Chekhov's work as a doctor enriched his writing by bringing him into intimate contact with all sections of Russian society: for example, he witnessed at first hand the peasants' unhealthy and cramped living conditions, which he recalled in his short story "Peasants". Chekhov visited the upper classes as well, recording in his notebook: "Aristocrats? The same ugly bodies and physical uncleanliness, the same toothless old age and disgusting death, as with market-women." In 1893/1894 he worked as a Zemstvo doctor in Zvenigorod, which has numerous sanatoriums and rest homes. A local hospital is named after him.

In 1894, Chekhov began writing his play The Seagull in a lodge he had built in the orchard at Melikhovo. In the two years since he had moved to the estate, he had refurbished the house, taken up agriculture and horticulture, tended the orchard and the pond, and planted many trees, which, according to Mikhail, he "looked after ... as though they were his children. Like Colonel Vershinin in his Three Sisters, as he looked at them he dreamed of what they would be like in three or four hundred years."

The first night of The Seagull, at the Alexandrinsky Theatre in St. Petersburg on 17 October 1896, was a fiasco, as the play was booed by the audience, stinging Chekhov into renouncing the theatre. But the play so impressed the theatre director Vladimir Nemirovich-Danchenko that he convinced his colleague Konstantin Stanislavski to direct a new production for the innovative Moscow Art Theatre in 1898. Stanislavski's attention to psychological realism and ensemble playing coaxed the buried subtleties from the text, and restored Chekhov's interest in playwriting. The Art Theatre commissioned more plays from Chekhov and the following year staged Uncle Vanya, which Chekhov had completed in 1896. In the last decades of his life he became an atheist.

Yalta
In March 1897, Chekhov suffered a major haemorrhage of the lungs while on a visit to Moscow.  With great difficulty he was persuaded to enter a clinic, where the doctors diagnosed tuberculosis on the upper part of his lungs and ordered a change in his manner of life.

After his father's death in 1898, Chekhov bought a plot of land on the outskirts of Yalta and built a villa (The White Dacha), into which he moved with his mother and sister the following year. Though he planted trees and flowers, kept dogs and tame cranes, and received guests such as Leo Tolstoy and Maxim Gorky, Chekhov was always relieved to leave his "hot Siberia" for Moscow or travels abroad. He vowed to move to Taganrog as soon as a water supply was installed there. In Yalta he completed two more plays for the Art Theatre, composing with greater difficulty than in the days when he "wrote serenely, the way I eat pancakes now". He took a year each over Three Sisters and The Cherry Orchard.

On 25 May 1901, Chekhov married Olga Knipper quietly, owing to his horror of weddings. She was a former protégée and sometime lover of Nemirovich-Danchenko whom he had first met at rehearsals for The Seagull. Up to that point, Chekhov, known as "Russia's most elusive literary bachelor", had preferred passing liaisons and visits to brothels over commitment. He had once written to Suvorin:

The letter proved prophetic of Chekhov's marital arrangements with Olga: he lived largely at Yalta, she in Moscow, pursuing her acting career. In 1902, Olga suffered a miscarriage; and Donald Rayfield has offered evidence, based on the couple's letters, that conception occurred when Chekhov and Olga were apart, although Russian scholars have rejected that claim. The literary legacy of this long-distance marriage is a correspondence that preserves gems of theatre history, including shared complaints about Stanislavski's directing methods and Chekhov's advice to Olga about performing in his plays.

In Yalta, Chekhov wrote one of his most famous stories, "The Lady with the Dog" (also translated from the Russian as "Lady with Lapdog"), which depicts what at first seems a casual liaison between a cynical married man and an unhappy married woman who meet while holidaying in Yalta. Neither expects anything lasting from the encounter.  Unexpectedly though, they gradually fall deeply in love and end up risking scandal and the security of their family lives.  The story masterfully captures their feelings for each other, the inner transformation undergone by the disillusioned male protagonist as a result of falling deeply in love, and their inability to resolve the matter by either letting go of their families or of each other.

Death
In May 1903 Chekhov visited Moscow; the prominent lawyer Vasily Maklakov visited him almost every day. Maklakov signed Chekhov's will. By May 1904 Chekhov was terminally ill with tuberculosis. Mikhail Chekhov recalled that "everyone who saw him secretly thought the end was not far off, but the nearer [he] was to the end, the less he seemed to realise it". On 3 June he set off with Olga for the German spa town of Badenweiler in the Black Forest in Germany, from where he wrote outwardly jovial letters to his sister Masha, describing the food and surroundings, and assuring her and his mother that he was getting better. In his last letter he complained about the way German women dressed. Chekhov died on 15 July 1904 at the age of 44 after a long fight with tuberculosis, the same disease that killed his brother.

Chekhov's death has become one of "the great set pieces of literary history"retold, embroidered, and fictionalized many times since, notably in the 1987 short story "Errand" by Raymond Carver. In 1908 Olga wrote this account of her husband's last moments:

Chekhov's body was transported to Moscow in a refrigerated railway-car meant for oysters, a detail that offended Gorky. Some of the thousands of mourners followed the funeral procession of a General Keller by mistake, to the accompaniment of a military band. Chekhov was buried next to his father at the Novodevichy Cemetery.

Legacy

A few months before he died, Chekhov told the writer Ivan Bunin that he thought people might go on reading his writings for seven years. "Why seven?", asked Bunin. "Well, seven and a half", Chekhov replied. "That's not bad. I've got six years to live."
Chekhov's posthumous reputation greatly exceeded his expectations. The ovations for the play The Cherry Orchard in the year of his death served to demonstrate the Russian public's acclaim for the writer, which placed him second in literary celebrity only to Tolstoy, who outlived him by six years. Tolstoy was an early admirer of Chekhov's short stories and had a series that he deemed "first quality" and "second quality" bound into a book. In the first category were: Children, The Chorus Girl, A Play, Home, Misery, The Runaway, In Court, Vanka, Ladies, A Malefactor, The Boys, Darkness, Sleepy, The Helpmate, and The Darling; in the second: A Transgression, Sorrow, The Witch, Verochka, In a Strange Land, The Cook's Wedding, A Tedious Business, An Upheaval, Oh! The Public!, The Mask, A Woman's Luck, Nerves, The Wedding, A Defenceless Creature, and Peasant Wives.

Chekhov's work also found praise from several of Russia's most influential radical political thinkers. If anyone doubted the gloom and miserable poverty of Russia in the 1880s, the anarchist theorist Peter Kropotkin responded, "read only Chekhov's novels!" Raymond Tallis further recounts that Vladimir Lenin believed his reading of the short story Ward No. 6 "made him a revolutionary". Upon finishing the story, Lenin is said to have remarked: "I absolutely had the feeling that I was shut up in Ward 6 myself!"

In Chekhov's lifetime, British and Irish critics generally did not find his work pleasing; E. J. Dillon thought "the effect on the reader of Chekhov's tales was repulsion at the gallery of human waste represented by his fickle, spineless, drifting people" and R. E. C. Long said "Chekhov's characters were repugnant, and that Chekhov revelled in stripping the last rags of dignity from the human soul". After his death, Chekhov was reappraised. Constance Garnett's translations won him an English-language readership and the admiration of writers such as James Joyce, Virginia Woolf, and Katherine Mansfield, whose story "The Child Who Was Tired" is similar to Chekhov's "Sleepy". The Russian critic D. S. Mirsky, who lived in England, explained Chekhov's popularity in that country by his "unusually complete rejection of what we may call the heroic values". In Russia itself, Chekhov's drama fell out of fashion after the revolution, but it was later incorporated into the Soviet canon. The character of Lopakhin, for example, was reinvented as a hero of the new order, rising from a modest background so as eventually to possess the gentry's estates.

Despite Chekhov's reputation as a playwright, William Boyd asserts that his short stories represent the greater achievement. Raymond Carver, who wrote the short story "Errand" about Chekhov's death, believed that Chekhov was the greatest of all short story writers:

Style

One of the first non-Russians to praise Chekhov's plays was George Bernard Shaw, who subtitled his Heartbreak House "A Fantasia in the Russian Manner on English Themes", and pointed out similarities between the predicament of the British landed class and that of their Russian counterparts as depicted by Chekhov: "the same nice people, the same utter futility".

Ernest Hemingway, another writer influenced by Chekhov, was more grudging: "Chekhov wrote about six good stories. But he was an amateur writer." And Vladimir Nabokov criticised Chekhov's "medley of dreadful prosaisms, ready-made epithets, repetitions". But he also declared “yet it is his works which I would take on a trip to another planet” and called "The Lady with the Dog" "one of the greatest stories ever written" in its depiction of a problematic relationship, and described Chekhov as writing "the way one person relates to another the most important things in his life, slowly and yet without a break, in a slightly subdued voice".

For the writer William Boyd, Chekhov's historical accomplishment was to abandon what William Gerhardie called the "event plot" for something more "blurred, interrupted, mauled or otherwise tampered with by life".

Virginia Woolf mused on the unique quality of a Chekhov story in The Common Reader (1925):

Michael Goldman has said of the elusive quality of Chekhov's comedies: "Having learned that Chekhov is comic ... Chekhov is comic in a very special, paradoxical way. His plays depend, as comedy does, on the vitality of the actors to make pleasurable what would otherwise be painfully awkward—inappropriate speeches, missed connections, faux pas, stumbles, childishness—but as part of a deeper pathos; the stumbles are not pratfalls but an energized, graceful dissolution of purpose."

Influence on dramatic arts

In the United States, Chekhov's reputation began its rise slightly later, partly through the influence of Stanislavski's system of acting, with its notion of subtext: "Chekhov often expressed his thought not in speeches", wrote Stanislavski, "but in pauses or between the lines or in replies consisting of a single word ... the characters often feel and think things not expressed in the lines they speak." The Group Theatre, in particular, developed the subtextual approach to drama, influencing generations of American playwrights, screenwriters, and actors, including Clifford Odets, Elia Kazan and, in particular, Lee Strasberg. In turn, Strasberg's Actors Studio and the "Method" acting approach influenced many actors, including Marlon Brando and Robert De Niro, though by then the Chekhov tradition may have been distorted by a preoccupation with realism. In 1981, the playwright Tennessee Williams adapted The Seagull as The Notebook of Trigorin. One of Anton's nephews, Michael Chekhov, would also contribute heavily to modern theatre, particularly through his unique acting methods which developed Stanislavski's ideas further.

Alan Twigg, the chief editor and publisher of the Canadian book review magazine B.C. BookWorld wrote:

Chekhov has also influenced the work of Japanese playwrights including Shimizu Kunio, Yōji Sakate, and Ai Nagai. Critics have noted similarities in how Chekhov and Shimizu use a mixture of light humour as well as an intense depictions of longing. Sakate adapted several of Chekhov's plays and transformed them in the general style of nō. Nagai also adapted Chekhov's plays, including Three Sisters, and transformed his dramatic style into Nagai's style of satirical realism while emphasising the social issues depicted in the play.

Chekhov's works have been adapted for the screen, including Sidney Lumet's Sea Gull and Louis Malle's Vanya on 42nd Street. Laurence Olivier's final effort as a film director was a 1970 adaption of Three Sisters in which he also played a supporting role. His work has also served as inspiration or been referenced in numerous films. In Andrei Tarkovsky's 1975 film The Mirror, characters discuss his short story "Ward No. 6". Woody Allen has been influenced by Chekhov and references to his works are present in many of his films including Love and Death (1975), Interiors (1978) and Hannah and Her Sisters (1986). Plays by Chekhov are also referenced in François Truffaut's 1980 drama film The Last Metro, which is set in a theatre. The Cherry Orchard has a role in the comedy film Henry's Crime (2011). A portion of a stage production of Three Sisters appears in the 2014 drama film Still Alice.  The 2022 Foreign Language Oscar winner, Drive My Car, is centered on a production of Uncle Vanya.
 
Several of Chekhov's short stories were adapted as episodes of the 1986 Indian anthology television series Katha Sagar. Another Indian television series titled Chekhov Ki Duniya aired on DD National in the 1990s, adapting different works of Chekhov.

Nuri Bilge Ceylan's Palme d'Or winner Winter Sleep was adapted from the short story "The Wife" by Anton Chekhov.

Publications

See also

 Chekhov Library
 Chekhov Monument in Rostov-on-Don
 Maria Chekhova
 Ann Dunnigan, English-language translator
 Jean-Claude van Itallie, English-language translator

Explanatory notes

Citations

General and cited sources 

 Allen, David, Performing Chekhov, Routledge (UK), 2001, 
 Bartlett, Rosamund, and Anthony Phillips (translators), Chekhov: A Life in Letters, Penguin Books, 2004, 
 Bartlett, Rosamund, Chekhov: Scenes from a Life, Free Press, 2004, 
 Benedetti, Jean (editor and translator), Dear Writer, Dear Actress: The Love Letters of Olga Knipper and Anton Chekhov, Methuen Publishing Ltd, 1998 edition, 
 Benedetti, Jean, Stanislavski: An Introduction, Methuen Drama, 1989 edition, 
 Borny, Geoffrey, Interpreting Chekhov, ANU Press, 2006, free download
 Chekhov, Anton, About Love and Other Stories, translated by Rosamund Bartlett, Oxford University Press, 2004, 
 Chekhov, Anton, The Undiscovered Chekhov: Fifty New Stories, translated by Peter Constantine, Duck Editions, 2001, 
 Chekhov, Anton, Easter Week, translated by Michael Henry Heim, engravings by Barry Moser, Shackman Press, 2010
 
 Chekhov, Anton, Letters of Anton Chekhov to His Family and Friends with Biographical Sketch, translated by Constance Garnett, Macmillan, 1920. Full text at Gutenberg.. Retrieved 16 February 2007.
 Chekhov, Anton, Note-Book of Anton Chekhov, translated by S. S. Koteliansky and Leonard Woolf, B.W. Huebsch, 1921. Full text at Gutenberg.. Retrieved 16 February 2007.
 Chekhov, Anton, The Other Chekhov, edited by Okla Elliott and Kyle Minor, with story introductions by Pinckney Benedict, Fred Chappell, Christopher Coake, Paul Crenshaw, Dorothy Gambrell, Steven Gillis, Michelle Herman, Jeff Parker, Benjamin Percy, and David R. Slavitt. New American Press, 2008 edition, 
 Chekhov, Anton, Seven Short Novels, translated by Barbara Makanowitzky, W. W. Norton & Company, 2003 edition, 
 Clyman, T. W. (Ed.).  A Chekhov companion. Westport, Ct: Greenwood Press, (1985). 
 Finke, Michael C., Chekhov's 'Steppe': A Metapoetic Journey, an essay in Anton Chekhov Rediscovered, ed Savely Senderovich and Munir Sendich, Michigan Russian Language Journal, 1988, 
 Finke, Michael C., Seeing Chekhov: Life and Art, Cornell UP, 2005, 
 Gerhardie, William, Anton Chekhov, Macdonald, (1923) 1974 edition, 
 Gorky, Maksim, Alexander Kuprin, and I.A. Bunin, Reminiscences of Anton Chekhov, translated by S. S. Koteliansky and Leonard Woolf, B.W.Huebsch, 1921. Read at eldritchpress.. Retrieved 16 February 2007.
 Gottlieb, Vera, and Paul Allain (eds), The Cambridge Companion to Chekhov, Cambridge University Press, 2000, 
 Jackson, Robert Louis, Dostoevsky in Chekhov's Garden of Eden – 'Because of Little Apples', in Dialogues with Dostoevsky, Stanford University Press, 1993, 
 Klawans, Harold L., Chekhov's Lie, 1997, .  About the challenges of combining writing with the medical life.
 
 Miles, Patrick (ed), Chekhov on the British Stage, Cambridge University Press, 1993, 
 Nabokov, Vladimir, Anton Chekhov, in Lectures on Russian Literature, Harvest/HBJ Books, [1981] 2002 edition, .
 Pitcher, Harvey, Chekhov's Leading Lady: Portrait of the Actress Olga Knipper, J Murray, 1979, 
 Prose, Francine, Learning from Chekhov, in Writers on Writing, ed. Robert Pack and Jay Parini, UPNE, 1991, 
 
 Sekirin, Peter. "Memories of Chekhov: Accounts of the Writer from His Family, Friends and Contemporaries," MacFarland Publishers, 2011, 
 
 Speirs, L. Tolstoy and Chekhov. Cambridge, England: University Press, (1971), 
 Stanislavski, Constantin, My Life in Art, Methuen Drama, 1980 edition, 
 Styan, John Louis, Modern Drama in Theory and Practice, Cambridge University Press, 1981, 
 
 Zeiger, Arthur, The Plays of Anton Chekhov, Claxton House, Inc., New York, NY, 1945.
 Tufarulo, G, M., La Luna è morta e lo specchio infranto. Miti letterari del Novecento, vol.1 – G. Laterza, Bari, 2009– .

External links

 Biographical
 
 Biography at The Literature Network
 "Chekhov's Legacy" by Cornel West at NPR, 2004
 The International competition of philological, culture and film studies works dedicated to Anton Chekhov's life and creative work 

 Documentary
 2010: Tschechow lieben (Tschechow and Women) – Director: Marina Rumjanzewa – Language: German

 Works
 
 . All Constance Garnett's translations of the short stories and letters are available, plus the edition of the Note-book translated by S. S. Koteliansky and Leonard Woolf – see the "References" section for print publication details of all of these. Site also has translations of all the plays.
 
 
 201 Stories by Anton Chekhov, translated by Constance Garnett presented in chronological order of Russian publication with annotations.
 Антон Павлович Чехов. Указатель Texts of Chekhov's works in the original Russian, listed in chronological order, and also alphabetically by title. Retrieved June 2013. 
 Антон Павлович Чехов Texts of Chekhov's works in the original Russian. Retrieved 16 February 2007. 
 

 
1860 births
1904 deaths
19th-century dramatists and playwrights from the Russian Empire
19th-century physicians from the Russian Empire
19th-century short story writers from the Russian Empire
20th-century deaths from tuberculosis
20th-century Russian dramatists and playwrights
20th-century Russian physicians
20th-century Russian short story writers
Burials at Novodevichy Cemetery
Comedy writers
Dramaturges
Modernism
Modernist theatre
Moscow Art Theatre
Moscow State University alumni
Writers from Taganrog
People from Yekaterinoslav Governorate
Positivists
Russian psychological fiction writers
Pushkin Prize winners
Russian atheists
Russian male dramatists and playwrights
Russian male novelists
Russian medical writers
Tuberculosis deaths in Germany